Kharkatwa is a village in West Champaran district in the Indian state of Bihar.

Demographics
As of 2011 India census, Kharkatwa had a population of 958 in 184 households. Males constitute 50.2% of the population and females 49.7%. Kharkatwa has an average literacy rate of 38.2%, lower than the national average of 74%: male literacy is 64.2%, and female literacy is 35.7%. In Kharkatwa, 20.7% of the population is under 6 years of age.

References

Villages in West Champaran district